Disa is a heroine of Swedish mythology.

Disa or DISA may also refer to:

Businesses
Disa Records, a Mexican record label, part of Univision Music Group
DISA motorcycles, produced in Hareskovby, Denmark during the 1950s by Jørgen Skafte Rasmussen
DISA (company) (Dansk Industri Syndikat A/S), a Danish company that produced the Madsen machine gun

Organisations
Data Interchange Standards Association
Defense Information Systems Agency, a United States Department of Defense combat support agency
Directorate of Information and Security of Angola (Direção de Informação e Segurança de Angola), a secret police force

Other uses
1319 Disa, an asteroid
Direct Inward Systems Access, a feature of various private branch exchange (PBX) systems
Disa language, a minor Bongo–Bagirmi language of Chad
Disa (name), a female name
Disa Park, a building development in Cape Town, South Africa
Barbodes disa, a fish of family Cyprinidae
Disa (plant), named after the Swedish Disa by Carl Peter Thunberg
Order of the Disa, an honor issued by Western Cape Province, South Africa